Julio César Chávez Jr. vs. Marco Antonio Rubio, billed as Welcome to the Future, was a boxing middleweight bout for the WBC world title. The bout was held on February 4, 2012, at the Alamodome in San Antonio, Texas, United States. where 14,000 fans were in attending.

Background

Chávez
Chávez held an overall record of 44-0-1, having won twenty straight fights since enduring his career’s lone blemish six years ago. The bout with Rubio was the rising star’s second consecutive clash in Texas, racking up a fifth round TKO against Peter Manfredo Jr. in Houston last month, and second time he’s visited the home of The Alamo in his previous five fights.

Chávez claimed a middleweight belt in June via majority decision against Sebastian Zbik and made his first defense on November 19, a fifth-round TKO of Peter Manfredo Jr.

Rubio
Rubio had gone 10-0 with nine knockouts and has been a far more authoritative, confident-appearing fighter.

Among those 10 victories was an impressive seventh-round stoppage of one of the game’s elite prospects, David Lemieux, on April 8, 2011. Lemieux entered the fight with a 25-0 record and 24 knockouts and was hailed as a potential star.

He has not lost since being stopped in the ninth round by then-middleweight champion Kelly Pavlik in February 2009.

Main card
Middleweight Championship  Julio César Chávez Jr. vs.  Marco Antonio Rubio
Chávez defeated Rubio via Unanimous Decision.
Super Bantamweight Championship   Nonito Donaire vs.  Wilfredo Vazquez, Jr.
Donaire defeated Vazquez via Split Decision.

Preliminary card
Super Welterweight Bout   Vanes Martirosyan vs.  Troy Lowry
Martirosyan defeated Lowry via TKO at 2:53 of Round 3.
Super Bantamweight Bout   Raúl Hirales Jr. vs.  Shawn Nichol
Hirales defeated Nichol via unanimous decision.  (59-55, 55-59, 58-56)
Welterweight Bout   Wale Omotoso vs.  Nestor Rosas
Omotoso defeated Rosas via TKO at 0:55 of Round 6.
Lightweight Bout   Ivan Najera vs.  David Castillo
Najera defeated Castillo via TKO at 2:54 of Round 2.
Welterweight Bout   Alex Saucedo vs.  Jean Colon
Saucedo defeated Colon via KO at 1:03 of Round 1.
Super Flyweight Bout   Adam Lopez vs.  Richard Hernandez
Lopez defeated Hernandez via TKO at 2:1 of Round 1.
Featherweight Bout   Jeremy Longoria vs.  Ricardo Valencia
Valencia defeated Longoria via unanimous decision.  (36-39, 36-39, 37-38)

Result
Chávez retained the WBC middleweight title, earning a unanimous decision over fellow Mexican Rubio. The judges scored the bout 118-110, 116-112 115-113 for Chávez, which drew a mixed reaction from the 14,120 in attendance at the Alamodome. Neither fighter went down despite taking continuous heavy blows to the head and body throughout the 12-round bout. Chavez Jr. overcame a gutsy performance by Rubio despite having some trouble entering the fight.

Notes
Rubio stated after the fight: "He re-gained a lot of weight. I re-gained my usual weight." and "I feel that he was very well protected. They didn't even do any testing which should have been done".  However, Rubio neglected to mention that the local Texas commission also did not to test him, along with the co-feature fighters Donaire and Vazquez Jr. According to the commission, they made the mistake of not booking a testing laboratory for the event in advance. Former world champion Julio César Chávez was at ringside, providing Spanish color commentary for Donaire's bout before watching his son's fight as a spectator. Among those in attendance were former world champions "Sugar" Shane Mosley of Golden Boy Promotions and San Antonio native Jesse James Leija.

International Broadcasting

Notes

External links
Julio Cesar Chavez Jr vs. Marco Antonio Rubio Official Fight Card from BoxRec
Official Fight Trailer
Top Rank Boxing

Boxing matches
2012 in boxing
Boxing in Texas
Sports competitions in San Antonio
2012 in sports in Texas
Boxing on HBO
February 2012 sports events in the United States